Qasr El Eyni Hospital is a research and teaching hospital in Cairo, Egypt. This hospital is affiliated with the Qasr El Eyni Faculty of Medicine, Cairo University and was founded on March 11, 1827.

History
In 1827, a medical school was established and attached to a military hospital in Abu Zaabal. The French doctor Antoine Clot Bey (Antoine Clot) became the first director of the medical school and hospital.

In 1837, the medical school and hospital was moved to Qasr El Eyni Street in Cairo. The hospital was renamed as "Qasr El Eyni hospital".

In 1838, The first school for midwifery was established in Qasr El Eyni Hospital.

In 1848, Clot Bey resigned and went back to France.	

In 1850, Abbas I appointed Wilhelm Griesinger as the director.	

In 1851, Griesinger's assistant Theodor Bilharz discovered the first known blood flukes, Schistosoma haematobium and Schistosoma mansoni, and with it the disease bilharzia (schistosomiasis).

In 1855, Clot Bey was re-appointed director of medical school and Qasr El Eyni Hospital.

In 1858,  Clot  Bey returned to France for health reasons.

In 1925,  the medical school and Qasr El Eyni Hospital joined Cairo University. Dr. Welson was appointed as the new director of the hospital.

From 1929 to 1940,  Dr. Aly Basha Ebrahim was appointed the Dean of the faculty and the director of the hospital.

In 1980, the Qasr El Eyni hospital was closed and the building was taken down.

In 1984, a contract for building the new Qasr El Eyni hospital was awarded to a French consortium formed from Sogya Company, Eypoty De Franc company and Set Folky.

In 1995, the new hospital buildings were completed. The cost of the new hospital was over 800 million F or around £E150 million.

In November 1995, Cairo university started the first employment stage of the new Qasr El Eyni hospital.

On April 8, 1996, former-president Hosni Mubarak and the President of France, Jacques Chirac inaugurated the new Qasr El Eyni hospital building.

Specialized units 
 Gastro-enteritis
 Qasr El Eyni Blood and Vessels Lab
 Intensive Care Centre
 Eyes Bank
 Specialized Medical Biochemistry Experimentation Unit
The Development of Medical Education centre
 Liver and Digestive System Endoscopy
 Clinical Toxicology Centre
 Fungi Research Centre
 Diagnosis and Therapy of Bilharzial Liver
 Genetics Unit
 The Unit of Renal Failure Therapy and Surgery
 T.B. Research Unit
 Measurement Unit for Fitness and Disability for Occupational Diseases
 Tumor Radiological Therapy and Nuclear Medicine Centre
 Tumor Symptoms Test Unit
 Open-Heart Surgery Unit
 The Physiological Research Unit
 Chromosome Tissue Transplant Research Unit
 Speech and Listening Therapy Unit
 Nose and Snoring Therapy Unit
 Cochlea Transplant, Ear Lab and Bank Unit
 Epilepsy Therapy Research Unit
 Leprosy Unit
 Ophthalmologic Laser Diagnosis and Therapy
 Diagnosing Parasitology Unit
 Medical Scanning and Diagnostics Unit
 Ultrasonic Diagnosis Centre
 Disintegrating Urinary Tracts Stones Unit
 Guest House, Catering and 'Fast Food' Meals Unit
 Special Medical Centre in the Pediatric Hospital
 Diabetic Children, Endocrinology and Metabolism Care Unit
 Functional and Microscopic E.N.T. Unit
 Nursing Development Research Centre
 Preservation, Redressing and Transplanting of the Tissue of the Motor System Centre
 Manial University Hospital; located fourth floor of Qasr El Eyni Hospital
 Virus Unit
 Allergy and Immunological Problem Unit
 Faculty of Dental Medicine Specialized Units
 Faculty of Nursing Specialized Units
 Prof. Hesham El Saket Learning Resource Complex (LRC) for surgical skills and training
 International Relations Office

References

Gallery of Photos

External links

 Cairo University Faculty of Medicine Official Website.
 Cairo University Urology Department Official Website.
 Official Website.
 Egyptian Association For International Medical Studies (EAIMS)
International Relations Office for Cairo University

 
Hospital buildings completed in 1995
Hospitals in Cairo
Teaching hospitals
20th-century architecture in Egypt